The Rimini Riddle was an Irish puppet television programme that aired from 1992 until 1995. It was produced and shown by RTÉ in Ireland.

Plot
Three siblings: oldest brother Rory, youngest brother Leo, and a middle sister named Ellen are sent to live with their selfish, greedy Aunt Vera in her boarding house, The Rimini House after the deaths of their parents.

It premiered on 26 September 1992 and ran for 95 episodes over three series, ending in 1995.

References

1992 Irish television series debuts
1995 Irish television series endings
1990s Irish television series
Irish television shows featuring puppetry
RTÉ original programming
Orphans in fiction